Qilixia is a town in Shaanxi, China. It lies on the West Qinling gold belt.

References

Cities in Shaanxi